The timberline wren (Thryorchilus browni) is a species of bird in the family Troglodytidae. It is found in Costa Rica and western Panama.

Taxonomy and systematics

The timberline wren is the only member of genus Thryorchilus, but its taxonomy at the subspecies level is unsettled. The International Ornithological Committee (IOC) considers it to be monotypic. The Cornell Lab of Ornithology's Birds of the World lists three subspecies, but notes that this treatment is disputed and that timberline wren should be "perhaps better considered monotypic." The Clements taxonomy and the Handbook of Birds of the World list the same three subspecies without comment. 

The three disputed subspecies are the nominate Thryorchilus browni browni, T. b. ridgwayi, and T. b. basultoi.

Description

The adult of the nominate subspecies has rich chestnut brown crown and upperparts and a reddish brown tail with thin dark bars. It has a broad gray-white supercilium, a chocolate brown stripe behind the eye, and grayish cheeks with narrow black markings. Its throat and chest are grayish white, its upper belly a mottled grayish white, its lower belly brown, and its flanks and vent area reddish brown. The juvenile is grayer below with a scalloped appearance. T. b. ridgwayi is larger than the nominate and has deeper reddish brown upperparts. T. b. basultoi has a wider supercilium, whitish markings on the upperparts and the sides of its neck, and has whiter underparts.

Distribution and habitat

The timberline wren's range is disjunct, and spans from central Costa Rica south to northern Panama. T. b. ridgwayi is found on Volcán Turrialba, Volcán Irazú, and adjacent areas in central Costa Rica. T. b. basultoi is found in the Cordillera de Dota of south central Costa Rica. The nominate T. b. browni is found on Volcán Barú, Volcán de Chiriquí, and Cerro Copete in western Panama.

The timberline wren inhabits páramo and near-páramo moorland at the upper edge of tree line, and is partial to bamboo thickets.

Behavior

Feeding

The timberline wren typically forages on or near the ground, sometimes fluttering to pick prey from leaves and creeping along mossy branches. Its diet includes small insects, caterpillars, and spiders.

Breeding

The timberline wren's breeding season in Costa Rica spans from April to June. Its nest is a hollow ball constructed of bamboo leaves lined with finer material. It has a side entrance and is placed  up in bamboo or a shrub. The typical clutch size is two.

Vocalization

The timberline wren's song is quite different from that of any Troglodytes wren; it is a repeated "series of half a dozen scratchy, warbling notes, lasting 2–3 seconds". Its call is "a harsh scolding 'churr'".

Status

The IUCN has assessed the timberline wren as being of Least Concern. Though it has a restricted range, it is considered common to abundant in its habitat. Much of its range is in national parks and receives little human pressure.

References

timberline wren
Birds of the Talamancan montane forests
timberline wren
Taxonomy articles created by Polbot